Vicky and the Treasure of the Gods is a 2011 German 3D adventure film directed by Christian Ditter. It is the sequel to the 2009 film Vicky the Viking.

Plot
During a raid on an English encampment by the Vikings from Flake, Vicky frees a bunch of Inuit. After they flee, he notices that one of them left a diary behind. After close inspection of the diary, Vicky realises that the "Chefs Amulet" worn by Halvar and passed down after generations is actually the key to the "Ice Fortress" in Greenland, where the treasure of the gods allegedly is hidden. At night however, Halvar gets captured by Sven the Terrible, so Vicky, as his descendant, has to guide the Vikings to the "Canyon of Odin", where Svens fortress is located. With them comes a girl called Svenja, which later turns out to be Svens daughter. After freeing Halvar and escaping through the canyon to Greenland, they arrive at the Ice Fortress shortly after Sven. It turns out you can only find the treasure if you solve the riddle in the diary. Vicky is forced to solve the riddle for Sven, which grants him access to the treasure: Mjölnir (Thor's hammer). Sven then proceeds to taze Halvar, and heat up the environment. As he tries to silence Halver for good however, Vicky pulls a shield in front of him. The lightning deflects of the shield and hits Sven instead, causing him to dangle of an edge. He tells his daughter to finish the two. Svenja however, who has become frenemies with Vicky, throws the hammer into a chasm. Halvar helps Sven up with a few requirements, and together they escape the melting Ice Fortress. The Vikings give Svens tied up crew as slaves to the Inuit.

Cast
 Jonas Hämmerle as Vicky
 Waldemar Kobus as Halvar
 Valeria Eisenbart as Svenja
 Günther Kaufmann as the Schreckliche Sven
 Nic Romm as Tjure
 Christian Koch as Snorre
 Olaf Krätke as Urobe
 Mike Maas as Gorm
 Patrick Reichel as Ulme
 Jörg Moukaddam as Faxe
 Hoang Dang-Vu as Yogi
 Mercedes Jadea Diaz as Ylvi
 Sanne Schnapp as Alva
 Christoph Maria Herbst as Pokka
 David Torok as Knight
 Jacob Matschenz as Dungeon Guard (Kerkerwächter) 1
 Elyas M'Barek as Dungeon Guard (Kerkerwächter) 2

References

External links
 

2011 films
2011 3D films
2010s children's adventure films
2010s German-language films
2010s adventure comedy films
2011 comedy films
German adventure comedy films
German 3D films
German children's films
Films based on children's books
Films based on Swedish novels
Films set in the Viking Age
Live-action films based on animated series
Films based on adaptations
German sequel films
2010s German films